Jason "Jace" Hall is an American film, television and video game producer.

Career 
Hall was one of the founders of Monolith Productions and is CEO of record keeping platform Twin Galaxies. His music video "I Play W.O.W" was featured on IGN's YouTube Channel, with over 17 million views.

He starred, produced, and wrote The Jace Hall Show and currently serves as the executive producer of web series The Morning After, having previously done so on ABC's TV series V. He was also a producer of the machinima series Chadam.

In 2012, Hall teamed up with Debbie Gibson to record "Electric Youth Reloaded", an updated remix of Gibson's 1989 hit single.

In March 2014, Hall purchased Twin Galaxies, an organization dedicated to adjudicating and archiving video game high scores and achievements. He currently holds the position of CEO and caretaker of the Twin Galaxies organization.

In 2016, Hall became the new CEO of esports organization Echo Fox.

In 2018, Hall served as co-chairman of the H1Z1 Pro League, a professional esports league for the video game H1Z1, and a partnership between Twin Galaxies and Daybreak Games. In November 2018, the H1Z1 Pro League was cancelled after a significant decline in the game's playerbase negatively impacted league revenue, resulting in reports that teams failed to receive scheduled payments from the league. Hall responded to the reports, stating that the league intends to meet its obligations to the teams.

References

External links
 
 Moby Games Database
 GameSpy

African-American people
American technology chief executives
Film producers from New York (state)
American video game designers
Living people
Monolith Productions people
American male video game actors
Esports executives and administrators
Echo Fox
Year of birth missing (living people)